Adrian Biddle,  (20 July 1952 – 7 December 2005), was an English cinematographer.

Early years
Biddle was a talented swimmer in his youth, and it was through this that he broke into the film industry. In 1967 the underwater photographer Egil Woxholt hired him to be his apprentice. Uncredited, he worked in this capacity on both the James Bond film On Her Majesty's Secret Service (1969) and Murphy's War (1971).

Career
After this, Biddle worked for Ridley Scott's advertising company R.S.A. where he worked on many advertisements with Scott and when Scott moved into films, Biddle followed him.

On The Duellists (1977) he was working as a clapper loader, before advancing to the position of focus puller on Alien (1979).

Following Alien, Biddle returned to working as a cinematographer on advertisements. During this time he developed a number of new lighting techniques and worked on a number of famous campaigns. His most famous advertisement was 1984 (1984), directed by Ridley Scott, for Apple. The advert's photography, combined with a personal recommendation from Scott, prompted James Cameron to hire Biddle for Aliens (1986) after the original cinematographer Dick Bush left over creative differences with Cameron. This marked Biddle's first credit as cinematographer in a feature film.

Biddle was a cinematographer on another 25 feature films, including Thelma & Louise (1991), for which he received a nomination for the Academy Award for Best Cinematography. In 1997, he was voted European Cinematographer of the Year for his work on The Butcher Boy. The last film that he worked on, prior to his death from myocardial infarction on 7 December 2005 as he was being driven by his wife, Mo, to a commercials shoot in the city centre, was V for Vendetta (2005), which was dedicated to his memory. He was survived by his wife and his three children, Alice, Esther and Alfie, who is also a cinematographer.

His brother is cinematographer Adam Biddle.

Filmography

References

External links 

Guardian Unlimited obituary

1952 births
2005 deaths
English cinematographers
European Film Award for Best Cinematographer winners
People from Woolwich
Underwater photographers